Erko Saviauk (born 20 October 1977) is an Estonian football manager and former professional player. 

Saviauk played as a defender for Pärnu, Flora, Kuressaare and TVMK.

International career
Saviauk made his international debut on 9 July 1997 against Lithuania. In total, he made 60 appearances and scored one goal for the Estonia national football team.

Honours
Flora
Meistriliiga: 1997–98, 2001, 2002, 2003
Estonian Supercup: 2002, 2003, 2004

TVMK
Meistriliiga: 2005
Estonian Cup: 2005–06
Estonian Supercup: 2005, 2006

External links

1977 births
Sportspeople from Viljandi
Living people
FC Flora players
Viljandi JK Tulevik players
FC TVMK players
Estonian footballers
Estonia international footballers
Association football fullbacks
JK Tervis Pärnu players
FC Kuressaare players
Estonian football managers